The Oriental Morning Post, or Dongfang Zaobao, also known as Oriental Morning News, was a Shanghai-based Chinese-language morning newspaper published in China. The newspaper was jointly founded by Nanfang Daily and Wenhui Xinmin United Newspaper Industry Group (文汇新民报业集团) on July 7, 2003. 

In the fall of 2008, Oriental Morning Post was the first media outlet to expose the melamine contamination of Chinese infant milk powder.

History
Oriental Morning Post was established on July 7, 2003. In September 2008, the newspaper was the first to report on the "Sanlu tainted milk powder incident".

On March 17, 2014, Oriental Morning Post was revised, with the new edition adding more news analysis and in-depth coverage.  On January 1, 2017, it stopped publication.

References

Defunct newspapers published in China
Publications established in 2003
2003 establishments in China
Publications disestablished in 2017
2017 disestablishments in China